Kalvis is a deity from the Baltic religion. He is the Lithuanian god of blacksmiths.

He is a divine blacksmith who creates the sun every day and makes rings so Aušrinė can marry the sun.  He is also said to create a new sun every morning for Aušrinė, he also makes a silver belt and golden stirrups for Dievo sūneliai. Kalvis was worshipped by the lithuanians up until the 15th century.

Marija Gimbutas mentions that the deity is similar to Hephaestus, Volundr, and Ilmarinen.

Name and etymology 
The god also goes by Kalvaitis, Kalvelis, or Kalējs. The word Kalvaitis derives from the word Kalvis meaning smith. In modern Lithuanian kalvis means black smith with the word being a derivative of the word kalti meaning to hammer.

References 

Lithuanian gods
Baltic gods
Smithing gods